Blagreaves and Sinfin are electoral wards in the city of Derby, England.  The wards contain three listed buildings that are recorded in the National Heritage List for England.  The lowest of the three designations for "buildings of national importance and special interest," Grade II is used for all of the listed structures. The wards are adjacent to each other to the south of the city centre.  The listed buildings consist of a commercial block, a statue and a pillbox.
  


Buildings

References

Citations

Sources

 

Lists of listed buildings in Derbyshire
Listed buildings in Derby